The list of ship commissionings in 1978 includes a chronological list of all ships commissioned in 1978.


See also 

1978
 Ship commissionings